Brown Township is one of twenty-two townships of Knox County, Ohio, United States.  The 2010 census found 1,862 people in the township.

Geography
Located in the northern part of the county, it borders the following townships:
Hanover Township, Ashland County - north
Jefferson Township - east
Union Township - southeast
Howard Township - south
Monroe Township - southwest corner
Pike Township - west
Worthington Township, Richland County - northwest

No municipalities are located in Brown Township.

Name and history
Brown Township was established in 1826. It is named for Major General Jacob Brown, of War of 1812 fame.

It is one of eight Brown Townships statewide.

Government
The township is governed by a three-member board of trustees, who are elected in November of odd-numbered years to a four-year term beginning on the following January 1. Two are elected in the year after the presidential election and one is elected in the year before it. There is also an elected township fiscal officer, who serves a four-year term beginning on April 1 of the year after the election, which is held in November of the year before the presidential election. Vacancies in the fiscal officership or on the board of trustees are filled by the remaining trustees.

References

External links
County website

Townships in Knox County, Ohio
Townships in Ohio